Typhoon Faith, known in the Philippines as Typhoon Norming, struck both the Philippines and Vietnam during December 1998. A tropical disturbance developed within the vicinity of the western Caroline Islands during early December. At midday on December 8, the system developed into a tropical depression. Tracking northwest at a brisk pace, the depression gradually intensified, and was upgraded into a tropical storm at noon on December 9. Quickly intensifying, Faith turned to the west-northwest, and after tracking near Samar Island on the evening of December 10, Faith attained typhoon intensity. After clipping the northern tip of Palawan Island, the typhoon entered the South China Sea at peak intensity. Across the Philippines, 33 people were killed, with 30 others wounded and 36 others listed missing. A total of 6,423 homes were damaged and 3,234 houses were destroyed, leaving more than 20,000 homeless. Damage was estimated at $25.9 million, with $6.82 million from crops, $15.9 million from public infrastructure, and $3.37 million from private infrastructure.

The typhoon tracked westward before tracking west-southwest, only to decelerate to the west-northwest. Increased wind shear took toll on the storm and caused a weakening trend. On December 12, Faith lost typhoon intensity, and two days later, Faith weakened into a tropical depression. After striking Vietnam, the depression rapidly dissipated over land. At least 38 people were killed in Vietnam with over 10,000 evacuated due to flooding in low-lying areas. Damage in Vietnam exceeded $20 million.

Meteorological history

On December 8, 1998, the Joint Typhoon Warning Center (JTWC) issued a Tropical Cyclone Formation Alert for a tropical disturbance located within the vicinity of the western Caroline Islands. At 00:00 UTC on December 9, the Philippine Atmospheric, Geophysical and Astronomical Services Administration (PAGASA) began to track the storm and assigned it with the local name Norming. At noon, PAGASA and the JMA upgraded the depression to a tropical storm, and six hours later, the JTWC followed suit. After crossing the 10th parallel north, Faith turned towards the west-northwest, and by December 10, the storm entered a period of rapid intensification. The JMA upgraded Faith into a severe tropical storm early on December 10, and twelve hours later, the JTWC classified Faith, just offshore Samar Island, as a typhoon.

The typhoon then tracked across the islands of Samar and Masbate, and next clipped the northern tip of Palawan Island before entering the South China Sea. After clearing the Philippines, Typhoon Faith tracked westward and briefly moved west-southwest. While maintaining peak intensity, Typhoon Faith slowly decelerated while tracking on a west-northwesterly course as it approached the Vietnamese coast due to the effects of another mid-latitude trough, which eroded the subtropical ridge to its north. As a result of this pattern change, Faith began to encounter increased wind shear, which triggered a weakening trend, and at 00:00 UTC on December 12, the JMA downgraded Faith into a severe tropical storm. At 00:00 UTC on December 14, Faith made landfall in Vietnam just north of Nha Trang. At the time of landfall, the JTWC estimated winds of  while the JMA determined that Faith had weakened to a tropical depression. Once inland, the storm began to quickly dissipate; the JMA ceased tracking the system at noon the same day.

Preparations and impact

Philippines
In advance of the typhoon, authorities issued a No. 3 storm signal, even though only a No. 1 storm signal was issued for Manila. On December 13, all classes in Manila were suspended. Sixteen Philippine Airlines flights to and from the central Philippines were cancelled. In the capital city of Manila, heavy rains caused street flooding. Several villages on Samar island were flooded. Around 400 people combined in the Catanduanes and Aklan provinces were evacuated to shelter due to rising floodwaters. A grocery store in Ibajay collapsed due to high winds. Toppled posts and downed trees clogged highways in the province of Sorsogon. Two bodies were recovered off Dumaguete. Offshore, the Philippine Navy rescued 100 people from a ferry traveling from the Philippines to Malaysia. A  boat sunk offshore Zamboanga City; all 10 of its crew were rescued to safety. Off of Pilas Island, four people were rescued and eleven were missing when the boat Myra-1 sank in heavy seas. Seventeen passengers were rescued, fourteen people were rendered missing, and two bodies were recovered when high waves toppled the motor vessel Lion No. 3.

Overall, 33 people were killed, with 30 others wounded and 36 others listed missing. A total of 6,423 homes were damaged and 3,234 houses were destroyed, leaving more than 20,000 homeless. Damage was estimated at $25.9 million, with $6.82 million from crops, $15.9 million from public infrastructure, and $3.37 million from private infrastructure. The storm affected 17 provinces, and 135 evacuation centers were opened. Following the storm, Philippines President Joseph Estrada pledged emergency funding for four provinces struck by the typhoon, along with a series of wintertime rainstorms.

Vietnam
Faith was the second tropical cyclone to affect Vietnam that month, following Tropical Storm Dawn. Twenty-one people were killed in Khanh Hoa Province and Binh Dinh Province, including five in Da Nang. Nationwide, at least 38 people were killed in Vietnam with over 10,000 evacuated due to flooding in low-lying areas. Damage in Vietnam exceeded $20 million.

See also

Typhoon Nancy (1982)

Notes

References

External links 

F
F
F
F
F
F